Mirjam Hannah Bikker (born 8 September 1982) is a Dutch politician who has served as a member of the House of Representatives since 2021. A member of the Christian Union (CU), she was previously elected to the municipal council of Utrecht in 2006 and Senate in 2015.

Biography
Bikker grew up in Moordrecht and Nunspeet; she attended her secondary education in Elburg. She studied law at Utrecht University and specialised in constitutional and administrative law. As a student she was also chairwoman of Sola Scriptura, a local student society belonging to the Reformed CSFR. 

From 2006 to 2013, she was a member of the municipal council of the city of Utrecht, as well as also group chairwoman. In 2007, she received national attention by protesting against a woman in a golden bikini on a big poster in the centre of Utrecht. From 2008 to 2010 and again from 2013 to 2015, she was a policy assistant to the Christian Union group in the House of Representatives. In 2015, she joined the Senate. In 2019, she became group chairwoman, succeeding Roel Kuiper.

In 2021, she was elected to the House of Representatives. She was mentioned as a potential minister in the formation phase of the Fourth Rutte cabinet.

Mirjam Bikker is married, has three children and lives in Utrecht. She is a member of the Protestant Church in the Netherlands (PKN).

References

External links
  Parlement.com biography
  Senate biography

1982 births
Living people
21st-century Dutch politicians
21st-century Dutch women politicians
Christian Union (Netherlands) politicians
Dutch women jurists
Members of the House of Representatives (Netherlands)
Members of the Senate (Netherlands)
Municipal councillors of Utrecht (city)
People from Gouda, South Holland
Protestant Church Christians from the Netherlands
Utrecht University alumni
20th-century Dutch women
20th-century Dutch people